The men's 100 metres at the 2012 European Athletics Championships was held at the Helsinki Olympic Stadium on 27 and 28 June.

Medalists

Records

Schedule

Results

Round 1
First 4 in each heat (Q) and 4 best performers (q) advance to the Semifinals.

Wind:Heat 1: +1.4 m/s, Heat 2: +1.0 m/s, Heat 3: +0.4 m/s, Heat 4: 0.0 m/s, Heat 5: +1.7 m/s

Semifinals
First 2 in each heat (Q) and 2 best performers (q) advance to the Semifinals.

Wind:Heat 1: +1.1 m/s, Heat 2: +0.1 m/s, Heat 3: +0.8 m/s

Final
Wind: -0.7 m/s

References

Round 1 Results
Semifinal Results
Final Results

100
100 metres at the European Athletics Championships